Sri Lakshmi is an Indian actress who is known for her comic roles in Telugu films. She has also appeared in Tamil films. More than 500 films to her credit, she later turned her attention towards television serials. Lakshmi has received four Nandi Awards for Best Female Comedian.

Early life 
Sri Lakshmi was born and brought up in Madras into a Telugu family from Rajahmundry, East Godavari district, Andhra Pradesh. Her father Amarnath and brother Rajesh are actors. Rajesh's daughter Aishwarya is an actress.

Career
Daughter of veteran Telugu actor/Producer Dr. Amarnath, Sri Lakshmi entered the film industry to support her family after her father had fallen sick. Initially, she did minimal and unnoticeable characters. After noticing her spark in playing comedic roles, director Jandhyala offered her a meatier role in Rendu Jella Sita, which turned her career. In the Telugu film industry, she acted in comedy films by ace director, Jandhyala. She also acted in K. Vishwanath films in comedy roles. She acted in more than 500 films, including Tamil, Kannada, etc. She later turned to TV plays. She is typically associated with stereo comic roles.

Filmography

Films

Telugu

Tamil
Sparisam (1982) - Debut in Tamil
Rendu Pondatti Kaavalkaaran (1992)
Payanam (2011) as Mrs. Venkat Raman
 Dhoni (2012)

Television

Dubbing
 The Chronicles of Narnia: The Voyage of the Dawn Treader (2010): Telugu version dub

Awards
Nandi Awards
Best Female Comedian - Sahanam (1996)
Best Female Comedian - Chelikaadu (1997)
Best Female Comedian - Police (1999)
Best Female Comedian - Preminchu (2001)

References

External links
 

Actresses in Telugu cinema
Indian film actresses
Indian voice actresses
Telugu playback singers
Telugu comedians
Living people
Indian women comedians
20th-century Indian actresses
Telugu actresses
Year of birth missing (living people)
21st-century Indian actresses
Indian television actresses
Actresses in Telugu television